Džeriņš (feminine: Džeriņa) is a Latvian topographic surname. Individuals with the surname include:

 Andris Džeriņš (born 1988), Latvian professional ice hockey player;
 Guntis Džeriņš (born 1985), Latvian professional ice hockey player;
 Ralfs Džeriņš (born 1997), Latvian professional football player.

Latvian toponymic surnames
Latvian-language masculine surnames